The women's 4 × 400 metres relay event at the 1971 European Athletics Indoor Championships was held on 14 March in Sofia. Each athlete ran two laps of the 200 metres track.

Results

References

4 × 400 metres relay at the European Athletics Indoor Championships
Relay